Riedijk is a surname. Notable people with the surname include: 

Michiel Riedijk (born 1964), Dutch architect
Yago Riedijk, Dutch member of ISIL

Other
 Neutelings Riedijk Architects, Dutch architecture firm

Dutch-language surnames